Polly Granzow (born September 29, 1941) is a former Iowa State Representative from the 44th District. She served in the Iowa House of Representatives from 2003 to 2009. She received her BA from the University of Iowa and her MA from the University of Northern Iowa.

Granzow served on several committees in the Iowa House - the Economic Growth committee; the Veterans Affairs committee; and the Human Resources committee, where she is the ranking member. She also serves on the Health and Human Services Appropriations Subcommittee.

Granzow was re-elected in 2006 with 5,559 votes (50%), defeating Democratic opponent Tim Hoy.

Education
Granzow graduated from Eldora High School and later obtained her B.A. in Spanish and teaching from the University of Iowa. She also received her M.A. in Teaching English to Speakers of Other Languages (TESOL) from the University of Northern Iowa.

Career
Outside politics Granzow is a partner in farming with her husband. She is also a former teacher and County Supervisor for Former Hardin County.

Organizations

Former chairs
County Central Committee
Greenbelt Home Care
Central Iowa Juvenile Detention Center

Former region chairs
Branstad for Governor
Education Advisor to Cooper Evans

Memberships
Republican Women
SATUCI (Substance Abuse)
Empowerment Area
Prevention of Disabilities
Child Care Advisory Board
Lions
Farm Bureau
Lutheran Church

Family
Granzow is married to her husband David and together they have two daughters, one son and six grandchildren.

References

External links
 Granzow on Project Vote Smart
 Granzow's Capitol Web Address

Republican Party members of the Iowa House of Representatives
Living people
Women state legislators in Iowa
1941 births
University of Iowa alumni
University of Northern Iowa alumni
People from Eldora, Iowa
2016 United States presidential electors
21st-century American women politicians
21st-century American politicians